Larry Rutledge is an American football coach.

Coaching career
Rutledge was the head football coach for the Coast Guard Bears located in New London, Connecticut.  He held that position for 3 seasons, from 1980 until 1982. His coaching record at Coast Guard was 7 wins and 21 losses.

References

Living people
Coast Guard Bears football coaches
Year of birth missing (living people)